Fonjallaz may refer to:

Fonjallaz (surname)
Fonjallaz (vineyard), a Swiss winery